The 1953 Kentucky Wildcats football team represented the University of Kentucky in the 1953 college football season. The team scored 201 points while allowing 116 points.  This was Bear Bryant's final season as head coach at Kentucky.

Schedule

Roster

Awards and honors
 Ray Correll, guard, All-America selection
 Steve Meilinger, end, All-America selection

1954 NFL Draft

References

Kentucky
Kentucky Wildcats football seasons
Kentucky Wildcats football